Leopold Blaschka (27 May 1822 – 3 July 1895) and his son Rudolf Blaschka (17 June 1857 – 1 May 1939) were glass artists from Dresden, Germany, native to the Bohemian (Czech)–German borderland, and known for the production of biological models such as the glass sea creatures and Harvard University's Glass Flowers.

Family background
The Blaschka family traces its roots to Josefův Důl (Josefsthal) in the Jizera Mountains, Bohemia, a region known for processing glass, metals, and gems.  Members of the Blacschka family had worked in Venice, Bohemia, and Germany.
Leopold referred to this history in an 1889 letter to Mary Lee Ware:

Born in Český Dub, Bohemia, and one of Joseph Blaschke's three sons, Leopold was apprenticed to a goldsmith and gemcutter in Turnov, a town in the Liberec Region of today's Czech Republic. He then joined the family business, which produced glass ornaments and glass eyes. It was there that Leopold developed a technique which he termed "glass-spinning", which permitted the construction of highly precise and detailed works in glass. He also Latinised his family name to "Blaschka", and began to focus the business on the manufacture of glass eyes.

Leopold married Caroline Zimmermann in 1846 and within four years their son Josef Augustin Blaschka was born.
Caroline and Josef died of cholera in 1850. A year later, Leopold's father died. Heartbroken, Leopold "sought consolation in the natural world, sketching the plants in the countryside around his home."

Glass marine invertebrates

In 1853, Leopold traveled to the United States. En route the ship was delayed at sea for two weeks by lack of wind. During this time Leopold studied and sketched local marine invertebrate, intrigued by the glass-like transparency of their bodies. He wrote:

On return to Dresden, Leopold focused on his family business, producing glass eyes, costume ornaments, lab equipment, and other such fancy goods and specialty items that a master lampworker was responsible for. He married Caroline Riegel in 1854. He used his free time to create glass models of plants, as opposed to invertebrates. This would become a base for the Ware Collection of Blaschka Glass Models of Plants (otherwise known as the Glass Flowers) many years later, but during this time Blaschka did not make any money producing the models. Blaschka's models eventually attracted the attention of Prince Camille de Rohan, who arranged to meet with Leopold at Sychrov Castle in 1857, the year that the Leopold and Caroline's son Rudolf was born. A naturalist himself, the Prince commissioned Leopold to craft 100 glass orchids for his private collection  and, impressed by Leopold's work, in 1862, "the prince exhibited about 100 models of orchids and other exotic plants, which he displayed on two artificial tree trunks in his palace in Prague," which brought the skill of the Blaschkas to the attention of Professor Ludwig Reichenbach.

The director of the natural history museum in Dresden, Prof. Reichenbach, was enchanted by the botanical models and positive that Leopold held the key to ending his own inability to properly showcase marine invertebrates; in the 19th century the only practiced method of showcasing marine invertebrates was to take a live specimen and place it in a sealed jar of alcohol. This killed the specimen, and due to time and their lack of hard parts, eventually rendered the specimens into little more than colorless floating blobs of jelly. The Dresden museum director desired specifically 3D colored models of marine invertebrates that were both lifelike and able to stand the test of time.  In 1863, Reichenbach convinced and commissioned Leopold to produce twelve model sea anemones. These marine models, hailed as "an artistic marvel in the field of science and a scientific marvel in the field of art," were a great improvement on previous methods of presenting such creatures: drawings, pressing, photographs and papier-mâché or wax models.

Knowing this and thrilled with his newly acquired set of glass sea creatures, Reichenbach advised Leopold to drop his current and generations long family business of glass fancy goods and the like in favor of selling glass marine invertebrates to museums, aquaria, universities, and private collectors – advice which prompted the swiftly and highly lucrative mail-order business that followed. Indeed, "the world had never seen anything quite like the beautiful, scientifically accurate Blaschka models" and yet they were available via so common a means as via mail-order per one's local card catalog. Museums and universities began purchasing them en masse to put on display much as Prof. Reichenbach had – natural history museum directors across the world had the same issue showcasing marine invertebrates. In short, Blaschkas Glass sea creature mail-order enterprise succeeded for two reasons: there was a huge and global demand, and they were the only and best glass artists capable of crafting literally scientifically flawless models. Initially the designs for these were based on drawings in books, but Leopold was soon able to use his earlier drawings to produce highly detailed models of other species, and his reputation quickly spread; the task additionally furthering the training of his son and apprentice (and eventual successor), Rudolf Blaschka. A year after the success of the glass sea anemones, the family moved to Dresden to give young Rudolf better educational opportunities.

Belgium 

In 1886, Edouard Van Beneden, founder of the Institute of Zoology, ordered 77 Blaschka models in order to illustrate zoology lessons. Some of these models are still on display at TréZOOr, in the Aquarium-Muséum in Liège.

Contact with Harvard

Around 1880, Rudolf began assisting his father with the models. In that year, they produced 131 Glass sea creature models for the Boston Society of Natural History Museum (now the Museum of Science). These models, along with the ones purchased by Harvard's Museum of Comparative Zoology, were seen by Professor George Lincoln Goodale, who was in the process of setting up the Harvard Botanical Museum. In 1886, the Blaschkas were approached by Goodale, who had come to Dresden for the sole purpose of finding them, with a request to make a series of glass botanical models for Harvard. Some reports claim that Goodale saw a few glass orchids in the room where they met, surviving from the work two decades earlier. Leopold was unwilling: his current business of selling glass sea creatures was hugely successful but, eventually, he agreed to send test-models to the U.S. Though the items were badly damaged by U.S. Customs, Goodale appreciated the fragmentary craftwork and showed them widely – convinced that Blaschka glass art was a more than worthy educational investment. His reasons for wanting the models was simple: At that time, Harvard was the global center of botanical study. As such, Goodale wanted the best, but the only used method was showcasing pressed and carefully labeled specimens — a methodology that offered a twofold problem: being pressed, the specimens were two-dimensional and tended to lose their color. Hence they were hardly the ideal teaching tools. However, having already seen Harvard's recently procured glass marine invertebrates, Professor Goodale - like Professor Reichenbach before him - realized that glass flowers would solve his problem: they were three-dimensional and would retain their color.

To cover the expensive enterprise, Goodale approached his former student Mary Lee Ware and her mother Elizabeth C. Ware; they were independently wealthy and already liberal benefactors of Harvard's botanical department. Mary convinced her mother to agree to underwrite the consignment of the glass models that enchanted them both. In 1887, the Blaschkas contracted to spend half-time producing the models for Harvard. They continued to spend their remaining time making marine invertebrate models. However, in 1890, the Blaschkas insisted that it was impossible to craft the botanical models for half the year and the sea creatures the other half; "they said that they must give up either one or the other."  As such, that same year the Blaschkas signed an exclusive ten-year contract with Harvard to make glass flowers for 8,800 marks per year. New arrangements were also made to send the models directly to Harvard, where museum staff could open them safely, observed by Customs staff. They modeled a great range of plants (in total, 164 taxonomic families) and plant parts (flowers, leaves, fruits, roots). Some were shown during pollination by insects, others diseased in various ways. Prof. Goodale noted that the activity of the Blaschkas was "greatly increased by their exclusive devotion to a single line of work." In regards to Leopold's feelings for the Glass Flowers enterprise, and the change to it from the successful marine creature business, Goodale wrote the following in the Annual reports of the President and Treasurer of Harvard College 1890-1891:

Production of Glass Flowers
Early in the making of Glass Flowers, Mary Lee Ware engaged in correspondence with Professor Goodale regarding the making of the collection, one of which contained a remark of Leopold's regarding the false rumor that secret methods were used in the making of the Glass Flowers: "Many people think that we have some secret apparatus by which we can squeeze glass suddenly into these forms, but it is not so. We have tact. My son Rudolf has more than I have, because he is my son, and tact increases in every generation." On this trend, he also once said that "One cannot hurry glass. It will take its own time. If we try to hasten it beyond its limits, it resists and no longer obeys us. We have to humor it."

The Blaschkas used a mixture of clear and coloured glass, sometimes supported with wire, to produce their models. Many pieces were painted, this work being entirely given to Rudolf. In order to represent plants which were not native to the Dresden area, the two studied the exotic plant collections at Pillnitz Palace and the Dresden Botanical Garden, and also grew some from seed sent from the United States. In 1892, Rudolf was sent on a trip to the Caribbean and the U.S. to study additional plants, making extensive drawings and notes. At this point the number of glass models sent annually to Harvard was approximately 120.

Rudolf made a second trip to the U.S. in 1895. While he was overseas - and eleven years into the project - Leopold died. Rudolf continued to work alone, slowing down production so as to achieve higher levels of botanical perfection. By the early twentieth century, he found that he was unable to buy glass of suitably high quality, and so started making his own. This was confirmed by Mary Lee Ware during her 1908 visit to Rudolf in a letter she later wrote to the second director of the Botanical Museum, Professor Oakes Ames. This letter appears to confirm the previous statement of Leopold's regarding his son; Miss Ware writes, "One change in the character of his work and, consequently in the time necessary to accomplish results since I was last here, is very noteworthy. At that time...he bought most of his glass and was just beginning to make some, and his finish was in paint. Now he himself makes a large part of the glass and all the enamels, which he powders to use as paint." This missive to Professor Ames was published on January 9, 1961 by the Harvard University Herbaria - Botanical Museum Leaflets, Harvard University Vol. 19, No. 6 - under the title "How Were The Glass Flowers Made?" In addition to funding and visiting, Mary took an active role in the project's progress, going so far as to personally unpack each model and making arrangements for Rudolph's fieldwork in the U.S. and Jamaica – the purpose of such trips being to gather and study various plant specimens.

In 1911, Rudolf Blaschka married Frieda (whose maiden name is unknown) in a quiet wedding: "We had only a few guests but a great deal of people here had shown cordial interest...We took a four day wedding trip to visit the Ore mountains and the Zenkerhuette in Josefsthal a 200 year old glass factory where my great-grandfather was master about 130-150 years ago...we reached the remote place easily by the new railroad and we had right the last chance to see the interesting factory building. They are just going to pull it down and it will disappear". The couple hosted Mary L. Ware during the third of her three visits to Dresden, and they became very great friends. In September 1923, Rudolf sent a letter to Mary stating that he had shipped four cases of specimens to the Museum in what was the first Glass Flowers shipment following World War I, but said that the complicated tax and inflation situation in Germany had left him without money and the Museum has not sent the 1923 payment yet. That November, he received $500 and a letter from Prof. Oakes Ames saying that Prof. Goodale had died that Ames was succeeding him, the money having been sent via Goodale's son Francis. Ames was not as passionate about the Glass Flowers as his predecessor had been, seeing several unknown issues, but Ames soon requested what he referred to as "Economic Botany", asking Rudolf to make glass Olea europaea and Vitis vinifera, a request which Rudolf answered with alacrity and eventually evolved into a series of glass fruits in both rotting and edible condition. However, Prof. Ames continued to exchange letters with Miss Ware discussing the project, namely the quality and speed of production as Rudolf ages, discussions which on Ames' part vary from controlled excitement to continued concern regarding the project and Rudolf's continuing ability to produce in a satisfactory manner.

Rudolf continued making models for Harvard until 1938. By then aged 80, he announced that he would retire. Neither he nor his father had taken on an apprentice, and Rudolf left no successor - he and Frieda Blaschka being childless. For Harvard, Leopold and Rudolf made approximately 4,400 models, 780 showing species at life-size, with others showing magnified details; under 75% are, as of May 21, 2016, on display at the HMNH, (the exhibit itself dedicated to Dr. Charles Eliot Ware, the father of Mary Ware and husband of Elizabeth Ware); the old exhibit contained 3000 models but this number was reduced for renovation purposes. Unlike the glass sea creatures – "a profitable global mail-order business" – the Glass Flowers were commissioned solely for and are unique to Harvard.

Legacy

Over the course of their collected lives Leopold and Rudolf crafted as many as ten thousand glass marine invertebrate models and 4,400 botanical ones that are the more famous Glass Flowers. 

The Blaschka studio survived the bombing of Dresden in World War II so, in 1993, the Corning Museum and Harvard jointly purchased the remaining Blaschka studio materials from Frieda Blaschka's niece, Gertrud Pones.

The Pisa Charterhouse houses the Museum of Natural History of the University of Pisa which includes a collection of 51 Blaschka glass marine invertebrates.

Leopold and Rudolf and their spouses are buried together in the Hosterwitz cemetery in Dresden.

See also
Robert Brendel
The Ware Collection of Blaschka Glass Models of Plants, Harvard Museum of Natural History
Blaschka Collection, Museum of Natural History of the University of Pisa

References

External links

The Story of Rudolf and Leopold Blaschka, video
The Blaschka Archives, held by the Rakow Library of the Corning Museum of Glass.
Blaschka collection at Natural History Museum, London
"Sea creatures of the deep - the Blaschka Glass models" National Museum of Wales. 15 May 2007.

Out of the Teeming Sea: Cornell Collection of Blaschka Invertebrate Models

Art duos
Flower artists
German glass artists
German male sculptors
19th-century German male artists
19th-century German sculptors
20th-century German sculptors
20th-century German male artists
German Bohemian people
Artists from Dresden
Scale modeling
19th-century German botanists
20th-century German botanists